Ambleside is a small sub-neighbourhood of Woodroffe North in Bay Ward in the west end of Ottawa, Ontario, Canada.   It is bounded in the West and North by the  Sir John A. Macdonald Parkway, in the East by New Orchard Avenue (North), and in the South by Richmond Road. The total population of this area was 2,546 according to the Canada 2016 Census.

It consists largely of high rise apartments or condominiums, built in the 1970s, but has some businesses on Richmond Road.  There is a small park also on Richmond Road, and the parkland of the Parkway forms its northern and Eastern sides.  There are no churches or schools in its area.

It is served by the #11 bus on the south and the #153 bus on all its streets.  There is planned to be a station of the western extension to the new Light Rail Transport system being built, at New Orchard Avenue.

References

Neighbourhoods in Ottawa